Donzère is a commune of the Drôme department in the Auvergne-Rhône-Alpes region in southeastern France.

It is a town located in the south of Drôme and on the left bank of the Rhône river, next to Montélimar.

Geography
The name of the town usually refers to the Donzère-Mondragon canal, which is an important artificial derivation of the Rhône. Donzère is also known for its gorge, which is the last shrinkage of the Rhône valley before its course joins the Mediterranean Sea.

For the anecdote, the "Robinet", place name of the Donzère gorge where the Rhône shrinks because of the cliffs, derives its name of a former landowner: Robin Berton nicknamed Robinet.

So, Donzère marked during a long time the northern boundary of the olive groves, but in recent years and consequence of the global warming, this limit seems slightly back northward next to the Cruas gorge, on the north of Montélimar.

Somewhat protected from mistral thanks to its hills located in the north, the village opens on the plain of Tricastin where were born the Mediterranean ambiance and cultivations.

The privileged location of Donzère in the Rhône valley (high place of passage) surely explains its recent economic and demographic dynamism.

Population

Sights
 The caves of the Donzère gorge
 The Molard villa, which includes the largest known wine cellar of the Roman world with a capacity of 2.500 hl
 The Saint-Philibert church (12th century) built by the Cluniacs
 The preserved battlements, with the fortified gates of Argentière and the font (12th century)
 The Renaissance castle of Claude de Tournon (16th century), bishop of Viviers and prince of Donzère
 The manor house Bouvier de Robinet (18th century)
 Old houses (from the 15th to the 18th century)
 The clock tower
 The Chapel Notre-Dame-de-Combelonge (from the 15th to the 17th century)
 The round table
 The former chocolate factory of Aiguebelle, with murals of the New Testament by Loys Prat
 The suspension bridge nicknamed "bridge of Robinet", built in 1847 according to the technique of Seguin
 The Virgin vow statue built after World War II

Personalities 
 Encyclopédiste Antoine Penchenier, died in Donzère in 1761
 Félix Clement, painter of the 19th century, Prix de Rome
 Loys Prat, painter of the 19th-20th centuries, Prix de Rome, Félix Clement's nephew
 , politician of the 20th century, French minister, deputy and councillor of the Drôme, member of the Constitutional council, dean of the Law Faculty of the Lyon III University

See also
 Communes of the Drôme department

References

Bibliography
 Félix Cardinale, Mémoire de maîtrise sur l'administration de Donzère au XVIIIe siècle, University of Aix-en-Provence.

External links

 Donzère town council website
 Donzère on the National Geographical Institute website
 Tourist office of Donzère

Communes of Drôme